Pecten albicans, common name Japanese baking scallop, is a species of marine bivalve mollusks in the family Pectinidae, the scallops.

Description
Pecten albicans has a shell reaching a size of 95 mm, with about 12 radiating ribs. The color of the surface usually ranges from light brown to dark brown, but it may be also orange or purple. The lower valve of this species is less convex than in Pecten excavatus. This species is of commercial value for fishing in Japan.

Distribution
This species can be found in the Japanese and the South China Seas.

Habitat
These scallops are present in shallow inshore reef areas, at depths of 40–115 meters.

References

 WoRMS
 Encyclopedia of life
 Discover Life

External links
 Pectensite
 Conchology

Pectinidae
Bivalves described in 1802